Harlow Mill railway station is on the West Anglia Main Line serving the eastern part of Harlow in Essex, England. Its three-letter station code is HWM.

The station and all trains serving it are operated by Greater Anglia.

History
The station was opened in 1842 as Harlow, on the Northern and Eastern Railway's line between London and Bishop's Stortford. It served the village of the same name, located on the London to Cambridge toll road. In the late 1940s, as the new town of Harlow was being built, the original village of Harlow was named Old Harlow and incorporated as a district in the new town. The station was renamed Harlow Mill on 13 July 1960, after the mill on the River Stort, just north of the station.

Services
All services at Harlow Mill are operated by Greater Anglia using  EMUs.

The typical off-peak service in trains per hour is:
 1 tph to London Liverpool Street
 1 tph to 
 1 tph to 
 1 tph to 

On Sundays, the services between Stratford and Bishop's Stortford do not run.

References

External links

Railway stations in Essex
DfT Category E stations
Transport in Harlow
Former Great Eastern Railway stations
Greater Anglia franchise railway stations
Railway stations in Great Britain opened in 1842